Ghulam Muhammad is a Pakistani politician who is member-elect of the Gilgit Baltistan Assembly.

Political career
Muhammad contested 2020 Gilgit-Baltistan Assembly election on 15 November 2020 from constituency GBA-21 (Ghizer-III) on the ticket from Pakistan Muslim League (N). He won the election by the margin of 904 votes over the runner up Muhammad Ayub Shah of Pakistan Peoples Party. He garnered 4,334 votes while Shah received 3,430 votes.

References

Living people
Gilgit-Baltistan MLAs 2020–2025
Politicians from Gilgit-Baltistan
Year of birth missing (living people)
People from Ghizer District